Lovelock Aerial Gunnery Range was a World War II facility in two Nevada areas used for "aerial gunnery, strafing, dive bombing [and] rocket fire". By 21 November 1944, the Lovelock Range had been approved by the Secretary of the Navy to be developed for Naval Air Station Fallon, and on 13 January 1945, "Lovelock Air to Air" began when "leased under the Second War Powers Act". By February 1945, land was being acquired for the North Range in the Black Rock Desert which was  that included  of "Patented" (leased private) land.

The Department of the Interior permit for the North Portion was cancelled by a 6 March 1946 letter, and the Bureau of Yards and Docks was directed to cancel the leases for the South Portion on 7 January 1947.

Black Rock Desert Gunnery Range
After a 1955 request by congressman Clair Engle, the Black Rock Desert Gunnery Range was closed by 1964.

Sahwave Mountain Air to Air Gunnery Range
In 1958, after the World War II, Lovelock South range was "renamed Sahwave Mountain Air to Air Gunnery Range. The 500,000 acres was acquired by Public Land Order No. 3632. Formal acquisition of the range was completed in August". Used for "only machine gun" fire, the  "Basic Sahwave air-to-air gunnery range" was in use by October 1958.

On 25 October 1976, after an INS platform failure during night training, Lockheed SR-71A, 61-7965, (Article 2016) was lost near Lovelock. The pilot and reconnaissance systems operator both ejected safely.

References

Bombing ranges
Military installations in Nevada
Military installations closed in 1947
United States Navy installations
Formerly Used Defense Sites in Nevada
History of Humboldt County, Nevada
Pershing County, Nevada